Charles (825/830 – 4 June 863) was the second son of Pepin I of Aquitaine and Engelberga.

He lived at the court of his uncle Lothair until 848, when, hearing of the deposition of his brother, he set out in March 849 with a band of followers to claim the Aquitainian realm.  He was captured by Vivian, count of Maine at the Loire and sent to Charles the Bald.  He was put in the monastery of Corbie as either a monk or a deacon.

He escaped in 854 to recruit an army to fight for his brother.  He had little success and fled to the court of Louis the German, who made him the archbishop of Mainz and archchancellor on 8 March 856.  He made a respectable bishop and died on 4 June 863 and was buried in St. Alban's Abbey, Mainz.

Sources
Dictionnaire de Biographie Française. Roman d'Amat and R. Limousin-Lamothe (ed). Paris, 1967.

Bishops in the Carolingian Empire
Frankish warriors
9th-century births
863 deaths
Archbishops of Mainz
9th-century archbishops 
Burials at St. Alban's Abbey, Mainz